140 Squadron may refer to:

 140 Squadron (Israel)
 140 Squadron, Republic of Singapore Air Force
 140 Squadron SAAF, Air Force Mobile Deployment Wing SAAF, South Africa
 No. 140 Squadron RAF, United Kingdom
 140th Aeromedical Transport Squadron, United States Air Force
 VAQ-140, United States Navy